The bastard big-footed mouse (Macrotarsomys bastardi) is a species of rodent in the family Nesomyidae. It is found only in Madagascar. Macrotarsomys bastardi is the smallest-bodied of the three species recognized within the genus Macrotarsomys. Two subspecies have been recognized (M. b. occidentalis and M. b. bastardi) however 2004 studies did not find consistent differences between the subspecies and recommended "subspecific epithets be abandoned for this species".

Habitat
This is a terrestrial species, found primarily in xeric habitats such as dry deciduous forests in the northwest and spiny forests in the south.

References

Musser, G. G. and M. D. Carleton. 2005. Superfamily Muroidea. pp. 894–1531 in Mammal Species of the World a Taxonomic and Geographic Reference. D. E. Wilson and D. M. Reeder eds. Johns Hopkins University Press, Baltimore.

Macrotarsomys
Mammals described in 1898
Mammals of Madagascar
Taxonomy articles created by Polbot